François Pyrard de Laval (1578 – ca. 1623) was a French navigator who is remembered for a personal written account of his adventures in the Maldives Islands from 1602 to 1607, which was part of a ten-year sojourn (1601–1611) in South Asia, et al. He was a native of Laval, and was a cousin to theologian Pierre Pyrard (1581–1667).

On July 2, 1602, Pyrard and a handful of sailors were shipwrecked on South Maalhosmadulu Atoll of the Maldives. They were taken captive by the Maldivians and spent five years as "unwilling guests" on the islands, with most of the time spent on Malé. The sailors endured malaria and sporadic cruel treatment during their captivity. Nevertheless, Pyrard took pains to learn the local Dhivehi language and by doing so was able to achieve an insight into Maldivian society never before experienced by a European. He took extensive notes regarding Dhivehi culture, customs and history.

In February 1607, the Frenchmen escaped from Malé by boat in the midst of chaos during a Bengali raid. Shortly after his return to Laval in 1611, Pyrard published an account of his 1601–1611 sojourn.

Bibliography 
 "The Voyage of François Pyrard of Laval to the East Indies, the Maldives, the Moluccas, and Brazil". Translated into English from the Third French edition of 1619, and Edited, with Notes, by Albert Gray, formerly of the Ceylon Civil Service, assisted by Harry Charles Purvis Bell, of the Ceylon Civil Service. Volume I. 1887. Pages lviii, 452 + 1 map, 11 illustrations.

See also
France-Asia relations

Notes

External links
 Distant lands and diverse cultures by Glenn Joseph Ames, Ronald S. Love
 South Asia Visions about: The voyage of Francois Pyrard of Laval to the East Indies, the Maldives, the Moluccas and Brazil, v.1]

History of the Maldives
French explorers
People from Mayenne
1570s births
1620s deaths